Within the city-operated parks system of New York City, there are many parks that are either named after Native American individuals or place names, or contain monuments relating to Native Americans.

Manhattan

Bryant Park (Benito Juarez Monument)
Central Park (Indian Hunter Monument)
Inwood Hill Park (Tulip Tree Marker)
Inwood Hill Park (Indian Road Playground)
Mannahatta Park
Minetta Playground
Minetta Triangle

Bronx

Mosholu Parkway
Ranaqua Playground
Sachkerah Woods Playground
Crotona Park (Indian Pond)
Oneida Triangle
Van Cortlandt Park (Chief Nimham Memorial)
Van Cortlandt Park (Indian Field)

Queens

Jamaica Playground
Kissena Park
Pomonok Playground
Rockaway Beach and Boardwalk
The Olde Towne of Flushing Burial Ground
Wayanda Park

Brooklyn

Canarsie Park
Marine Park (Lenape Playground)
Potomac Playground

Staten Island

Conference House Park (Lenape Playground)

References

Squares in New York City
Monuments and memorials in New York City
New York City parks-related lists